The 2013 If Stockholm Open was a professional men's tennis tournament played on indoor hard courts.  It was the 45th edition of the tournament, and part of the ATP World Tour 250 series of the 2013 ATP World Tour. It took place at the Kungliga tennishallenin Stockholm, Sweden between 14 and 20 October 2013.

Singles main-draw entrants

Seeds

 1 Rankings are as of October 7, 2013

Other entrants
The following players received wildcards into the singles main draw:
  Markus Eriksson
  Benoît Paire
  Milos Raonic

The following players received entry from the qualifying draw:
  Marius Copil
  Joachim Johansson
  Nils Langer
  Milos Sekulic

Withdrawals
Before the tournament
  Brian Baker
  Marin Čilić (suspension)
  David Goffin
  Sam Querrey
  Mikhail Youzhny

During the tournament
  Fernando Verdasco (abdominal injury)

Retirements
  Jürgen Zopp (lower back injury)

Doubles main-draw entrants

Seeds

 Rankings are as of October 7, 2013

Other entrants
The following pairs received wildcards into the doubles main draw:
  Isak Arvidsson /  Andreas Siljeström
  Jonas Björkman /  Robert Lindstedt
The following pair received entry as alternates:
  Patrik Rosenholm /  Milos Sekulic

Withdrawals
Before the tournament
  Marcelo Melo (abdominal injury)

During the tournament
  Fernando Verdasco (abdominal injury)

Finals

Singles

 Grigor Dimitrov defeated  David Ferrer, 2–6, 6–3, 6–4

Doubles

 Aisam-ul-Haq Qureshi /  Jean-Julien Rojer defeated  Jonas Björkman /  Robert Lindstedt, 6–2, 6–2

References

External links
 Official website 

 
If Stockholm Open
Stockholm Open
2013 in Swedish tennis
October 2013 sports events in Europe
2010s in Stockholm